Murjanatu Liman Musa (born 5 May 2000) is a Nigerian basketball player who currently plays for the Nigerian basketball side Air Warriors and the Nigerian National team.

Professional career
Murjanatu currently plays with team celta zorka in spain. 
murjanatu plays for the Nigerian side Air warriors Women's Basketball team, in the 2019 Zenith Women's Basketball league, the team defeated Mountain of Fire Ministries Women's Basketball team in the final, she was voted the MVP of the league having averaged 17 points and 15 rebounds and 3 assist in the Final game.

Nigerian National Women's Basketball team
Murjanatu represented Nigeria in the 3x3 basketball tournament at the 2019 Morocco Africa Games and 2019 African Beach Games, Cape-Verde, the team won Gold and Bronze respectively.

Murjanatu Musa was called up to represent the D'Tigress and to participate in the Tokyo 2020 FIBA Women's Olympic Qualifying Tournaments in Belgrade.

References

2000 births
Living people
Nigerian women's basketball players
African Games medalists in basketball
African Games gold medalists for Nigeria
Competitors at the 2019 African Games